Walter Birtles (born 16 April 1937) is a Canadian basketball player. He competed in the men's tournament at the 1964 Summer Olympics.

References

1937 births
Living people
Basketball people from British Columbia
Canadian men's basketball players
Olympic basketball players of Canada
Basketball players at the 1964 Summer Olympics
Basketball players from Vancouver